Josue Guzman (born June 16, 1991 in Santo Domingo), artistically known as BS El Ideólogo, is a Dominican reggaetón music producer. He was part of the staff that produced "El Manifiesto" by Henry G, a song that held the record as the longest song officially released, in addition to being nominated for various awards in the Dominican Republic.

BS El Ideólogo has worked with artists and producers with their singles and albums, including, TwoVm Para Cristo, Luigui López, Henry G, Challenge Salcedo, El Jeffrey El Canta Lindo, among others.

Musical career 
BS excelled in the genre cooperating with many artists from his country with only 17 years, being inspired on reggaetón artists and producers such as Luny Tunes and Nely El Arma Secreta. As part of the duo TwoVm Para Cristo, in 2016 he released an album titled Tour, with the single "Solo llora".

After this, he was nominated for the 2018 Iris Awards, and for the La Silla Awards with the song "La vida en el barrio", soundtrack of the film Voces de la Calle, with which they won as "Best song".

In the same year, he entered the Guinness World Records Book with his participation as a recording engineer in the song "The Manifiesto" by the artist Henry G, which has a duration of 3 hours and 26 minutes and 22 seconds, released and certified on 30 November 2017.

Currently, he is one of the owners of the Christian media Tómalo Tv Show, and is part of the Christian urban duo TwoVm Para Cristo, which were nominated in the 2021 El Galardón Awards as a Group or Urban Duo.

Discography 

 2009: Todo tiene su tiempo (as TwoVm Para Cristo)
2016: Tour (as TwoVm Para Cristo)

References

External links
Official website

1991 births
Dominican Republic rappers
Living people
Reggaeton record producers
Reggaeton musicians
People from Santo Domingo
Latin music record producers